Nectar guides are markings or patterns seen in flowers of some angiosperm species, that guide pollinators to their  rewards. Rewards commonly take the form of nectar, pollen, or both, but various plants produce oil, resins, scents, or waxes. Such patterns also are known as "pollen guides" and "honey guides", though some authorities argue for the abandonment of such terms in favour of floral guides (see for example Dinkel & Lunau). Pollinator visitation can select for various floral traits, including nectar guides through a process called pollinator-mediated selection.   

These patterns are sometimes visible to humans; for instance, the Dalmatian toadflax (Linaria genistifolia) has yellow flowers with orange nectar guides.  However, in some plants, such as sunflowers, they are visible only when viewed in ultraviolet light. Under ultraviolet, the flowers have a darker center, where the nectaries are located, and often specific patterns upon the petals as well. This is believed to make the flowers more attractive to pollinators such as honey bees and other insects that can see ultraviolet. This page on butterflies shows an animated comparison of black-eyed Susan (Rudbeckia hirta) flowers in visible and UV light.

The ultraviolet color, invisible to humans, has been referred to as bee violet, and mixtures of greenish (yellow) wavelengths (roughly 540 nm) with ultraviolet are called bee purple by analogy with purple in human vision.

References

External links
Dalmatian Toadflax from the Southwest Exotic Plant Information Clearinghouse.  (See archived version on the Internet Archive -- accessed on 2009-03-17).
UltravioletPhotography.com Online library of ultraviolet floral signatures.

Pollination